Bacchisa unicolor is a species of beetle in the family Cerambycidae. It was described by Breuning in 1956. It is known from Sumatra.

References

U
Beetles described in 1956